AISB may stand for:
 American International School of Bucharest in Bucharest, Romania
 American International School of Budapest in Budapest, Hungary
 American International School of Bamako in Bamako, Mali
 American International School of Bolivia in Cochabamba, Bolivia
 Apathy is Boring, also known as A is B
 Society for the Study of Artificial Intelligence and the Simulation of Behaviour